Jasper is an unincorporated community and census-designated place (CDP) in Lenawee County in the U.S. state of Michigan.  The CDP had a population of 412 at the 2010 census.  Jasper is within Fairfield Township and has its own post office with the 49248 ZIP Code.

Geography

Major highways
, known locally as Adrian Highway, runs south–north through the center of the community.

History
The first European settler in Jasper was Andrew Millet, arriving in 1824. A post office was opened June 18, 1874, with Henry Ferguson as the first postmaster. The Lake Shore and Michigan Southern Railway had a depot in Jasper. The station was at first known as Fairfield.
Jasper was one of the largest populated areas in Lenawee County prior to 1908 accounting for about 8,000 residents.  A Smallpox epidemic wiped out over half of the residents and most of the homes were burned to the ground in the southern two thirds of the town to try to stop the epidemic.

The community of Jasper was listed as a newly-organized census-designated place for the 2010 census, meaning it now has officially defined boundaries and population statistics for the first time.

Demographics

References

Unincorporated communities in Lenawee County, Michigan
Unincorporated communities in Michigan
Census-designated places in Lenawee County, Michigan
Census-designated places in Michigan
Populated places established in 1874
1874 establishments in Michigan